Halland County held a county council election on 19 September 2010, on the same day as the general and municipal elections.

Results
The number of seats remained at 71 with the Moderates supplanting the Social Democrats as the largest party with 24, an increase of four from in 2006. The party received 32.1% of a total valid vote of 189,909.

Municipal results

Images

References

Elections in Halland County
Halland